Jagdish Chaturvedi (born 27 March 1984) is a doctor, an ENT surgeon, an actor, an innovator and an Indian stand-up comedian made popular by his YouTube channel.

Education and research
Chaturvedi received his undergraduate training in medical sciences from Sri Siddhartha Medical College, Tumkur under Rajiv Gandhi University of Health Sciences, Karnataka. He completed his postgraduate training in Ear, nose and throat surgery from St. John's Medical College, Bangalore under the National Board of Examinations.

Inventions
Chaturvedi has contributed to the teams that invented the following:

ENTraview, that has been licensed and commercialised by ICARUS Design.

Sinucare, which has been commercialised by InnAccel Technologies Pvt Ltd.

Recognition
Chaturvedi was one of the 35 innovators under the age of 35 as chosen by the MIT Technology Review in 2016.

References

 

Indian surgeons
1984 births
Living people